WAP, follistatin/kazal, immunoglobulin, kunitz and netrin domain containing 2 is a protein that in humans is encoded by the WFIKKN2 gene.

Function 

The WFIKKN1 protein contains a WAP domain, follistatin domain, immunoglobulin domain, two tandem Kunitz domains, and an NTR domain. This gene encodes a WFIKKN1-related protein which has the same domain organization as the WFIKKN1 protein. The WAP-type, follistatin type, Kunitz-type, and NTR-type protease inhibitory domains may control the action of multiple types of proteases. [provided by RefSeq, Jul 2008]. ##Evidence-Data-START## Transcript exon combination :: AY358142.1, AK127743.1 [ECO:0000332] RNAseq introns :: single sample supports all introns ERS025083, ERS025084 [ECO:0000348] ##Evidence-Data-END##

See also 
Kazal-type serine protease inhibitor domain

References

Further reading 

 
 
 
 
 
 
 

Genes
Human proteins